Paralethe is a monotypic butterfly genus in the family Nymphalidae. Its one species Paralethe dendrophilus, the bush beauty or forest pride is found in South Africa.

The wingspan is 45–60 mm for males and 48–70 mm for females. Adults are on wing from late December to May. There is one generation per year.

The larvae feed on various Poaceae species, including Ehrharta erecta and Panicum deustrum.

Subspecies
Paralethe dendrophilus dendrophilus (eastern Cape)
Paralethe dendrophilus albina van Son, 1955 (eastern Cape (Pondoland), Natal)
Paralethe dendrophilus indosa (Trimen, 1879) (coast of KwaZulu-Natal and Zululand)
Paralethe dendrophilus junodi (van Son, 1935) (Transvaal)

References

Melanitini
Monotypic butterfly genera